Glen Falls is an unincorporated community in Harrison County, West Virginia, United States.

A significant part of Glen Falls was once a coal camp which was built around 1880. Glen Falls is largely residential and is essentially a bedroom community for Clarksburg. The area is provided with water service by the Clarksburg Water Board. Glen Falls is the home of the Glen Falls Baptist Church, which was founded in 1901. Glen Falls has had two schools, both of which have been closed and demolished. There was once a train station by the West Fork River in the early 1900s. It housed different stores and even a doctor's office. The superintendent's house from the coal camp is still standing, as are some of the tenants' houses.

References

Unincorporated communities in Harrison County, West Virginia
Unincorporated communities in West Virginia